Intersecciones en Antropología (English: Intersections in Anthropology) is a biannual peer-reviewed open access academic journal established in 2000 and published by the Universidad Nacional del Centro de la Provincia de Buenos Aires. It covers work on archeology, bioarcheology, and related disciplines. The editor-in-chief is Mariela E. Gonzalez (National University of Central Buenos Aires).

Abstracting and indexing
The journal is abstracted and indexed in:
Anthropological Literature
Arts and Humanities Citation Index
EBSCO databases
Scopus
Social Sciences Citation Index
The Zoological Record
According to the Journal Citation Reports, the journal has a 2019 impact factor of 0.513.

References

External links 

2000 establishments in Argentina
Anthropology journals
Spanish-language journals
Publications established in 2000
Biannual journals
Archaeology journals